The Selennyakh is a river in Sakha Republic, Russia. It is a left tributary of the Indigirka.

Course
It originates in the north-west of the Chersky Range. The river flows southeastwards through the Moma-Selennyakh Depression which is bound in this area by the Burkat and Khadaranya ranges, and in the east by the Selennyakh Range, then the river flows across the Ust-Yansky District, where Sayylyk, the only inhabited place of its basin is found.

In its middle course the Selennyakh makes a wide bend northeastwards and then flows across the Aby Lowland in a roughly eastern direction until it reaches the left bank of the Indigirka. The Selennyakh is frozen between October and May.

According to the State Water Register of Russia, it is a part of the Lena basin district.

References

External links 
 Geography - Yakutia Organized

Rivers of the Sakha Republic